is chatmonchy's first album which they released in 2004.  They were an unsigned band and sold the copies by hand in the Tokushima area, and achieved about 1500 sales.  This album is currently out of distribution.

Track listing 

2004 EPs
Chatmonchy albums